The 2009–10 Great West Conference men's basketball season marks the inaugural season of Great West Conference basketball.  The Great West is the first new Division I basketball conference since the Mountain West Conference began play in 1999. In 2008–09, the Great West Conference began competition in basketball, although they were transitioning to Division I at the time.

Preseason
On October 29, 2009, the Great West Conference held its first basketball media day.  The league's coaches voted South Dakota the inaugural preseason #1 and South Dakota senior forward Tyler Cain the preseason player of the year.

Great West Coaches Poll

Preseason All-Great West Team
First Team
 Tyler Cain, South Dakota
 Carl Montgomery, Chicago State
 Jheryl Wilson, NJIT
 Nick Weiermiller, Texas-Pan American
 Louis Krogman, South Dakota

Second Team
 Jordan Swarbrick, Utah Valley
 Travis Bledsoe, North Dakota
 Roman Gentry, South Dakota
 Travis Mertens, North Dakota
 Isaiah Wilkerson, NJIT

Honorable Mention: Mario Flaherty, Houston Baptist; Wendell Preadom, Houston Baptist; Gary Garris, NJIT; Nathan Hawkins, Texas Pan-American; Jon Montgomery, Chicago State; Ben Smith, Texas-Pan American

Preseason Player of the Year 
 Tyler Cain, South Dakota

Regular season

Postseason
As a new Division I conference, the Great West does not receive an automatic bid to the NCAA tournament.  However, the league's tournament champion will receive a berth in the CollegeInsider.com Postseason Tournament.

Conference awards & honors

Weekly awards
Great West Player of the Week
Throughout the conference season, the Great West offices name a player of the week.

References

External links
 Great West Official website